Leave It Beautiful is the debut studio album by Norwegian singer Astrid S, released on 16 October 2020 by Universal Music A/S and Virgin EMI. It followed a string of five extended plays and several singles and collaborations. It was announced on 15 September 2020 and was preceded by the three singles, "Dance Dance Dance",  "Marilyn Monroe", and "It's Ok If You Forget Me".

Background and development 
Astrid's first release of 2020 was a collaboration with American country singer Brett Young titled "I Do"; the song reached at number three in Norway. On 27 May 2020, Astrid announced the lead single "Dance Dance Dance" from her debut studio album would be released the following week on 5 June. The music video premiered a day later on 6 June. The second single, "Marilyn Monroe" was announced on 19 August 2020 and was released two days later. On 15 September 2020, Astrid announced her debut studio album would be titled Leave It Beautiful and would be released on 16 October 2020. The next day on 16 September, she announced the third single, "It's Ok If You Forget Me", which was released two days later on 18 September 2020.

Critical reception 
Leave It Beautiful received positive reviews from music critics. Elosie Bulmer from The Line of Best Fit stated that "Astrid S’ debut is a sleek collection of pop filled exuberance and relatability".

Track listing 
All tracks produced by Jack & Coke alongside Astrid S, except for "Marilyn Monroe" produced alongside Fred Ball, and "Leave It Beautiful", produced alongside A Strut.

Personnel 
Musicians
 Astrid Smeplass – vocals, background vocals (all tracks), piano (7)
 Eyelar Mirzazadeh – background vocals (1)
 Fred Ball – bass programming, drums, guitar, keyboards, percussion, programming (1)
 Svante Halldin – programming (all tracks), bass programming, drums, guitar, keyboards, percussion (1–4, 6–10); trumpet (9)
 Jakob Hazell – programming (all tracks), bass programming, drums, guitar, keyboards, percussion (1–4, 6–10); trumpet (9)
 Peter Axelsson – strings (6)
 Ludvig Soderberg – background vocals, bass programming, drums, keyboards, percussion, programming (10)

Technical
 Sören von Malmborg – mastering (all tracks), mixing (1–5, 7–10)
 Andreas Roos – mixing (6)
 Jack & Coke – recording (1–6, 8–10), executive production
 Anders Kjær – recording (7)

Charts

References

2020 debut albums